Anika Elia Rodríguez (born 4 January 1997) is an American-born Mexican footballer who plays as a defender for Liga MX Femenil side Tigres UANL and the Mexico women's national football team.

Early life
Rodríguez was born in Torrance, California. She attended Torrance High School and played youth soccer for Southern California Blues Soccer Club.

Club career

Portland Thorns
In June 2020, Rodríguez signed a short-term contract with National Women's Soccer League side Portland Thorns FC ahead of the NWSL Challenge Cup.

PSV
Also in June 2020, Rodríguez signed a one-year contract with Eredivisie Vrouwen side PSV. In April 2021, she signed a one-year extension.

Tigres UANL 
Rodriguez was signed by Liga MX Femenil side Tigres UANL on 18 June 2022.

International career
On 23 October 2021, Rodríguez made her debut for the Mexico national team in a 6–1 victory over Argentina at Estadio Gregorio "Tepa" Gómez.

Personal life
Rodríguez's younger sister, Karina Rodríguez, also plays for the Mexico women's national football team.

References

External links

1997 births
Living people
Citizens of Mexico through descent
Mexican women's footballers
Women's association football forwards
PSV (women) players
Portland Thorns FC players
Eredivisie (women) players
Mexico women's international footballers
Mexican expatriate women's footballers
Mexican expatriate sportspeople in the Netherlands
Expatriate women's footballers in the Netherlands
People from Torrance, California
Sportspeople from Los Angeles County, California
Soccer players from California
American women's soccer players
UCLA Bruins women's soccer players
American expatriate women's soccer players
American expatriate sportspeople in the Netherlands
American sportspeople of Mexican descent